End of Love is the fifth full-length album by indie rock band Clem Snide.  The album includes longtime live staple "Weird", as well as "Made for TV Movie", a song about Lucille Ball which includes a duet between lead singer Eef Barzelay and the daughter of one of the album's guest musicians.

Track listing
 "End of Love"
 "Collapse"
 "Fill Me With Your Light"
 "The Sound of German Hip Hop"
 "Tiny European Cars"
 "Jews For Jesus Blues"
 "God Answers Back"
 "Something Beautiful"
 "Made For TV Movie"
 "When We Become"
 "Weird"

The European limited edition release included the following bonus tracks:

 "The Ballad of David Icke"
 "South American Lullaby"
 "The Trick"
 "Tiny European Cars" (KEXP Live Radio Session)
 "Collapse" (KEXP Live Radio Session)

References

Clem Snide albums
SpinART Records albums
2005 albums